The Pyramid Mountains are a 30 mi (48 km) long, mountain range in central-east Hidalgo County, New Mexico. The city of Lordsburg and Interstate 10 lie at its northern border.

The range lies between the northeast corner of the north-south Animas Valley on the west and the Playas and Lordsburg valleys to the southeast and northeast respectively. The continental divide passes through the southern end of the range.

The Chihuahuan Desert has its northwest extension into the foothills regions of the Pyramid Mountains.

Description
The Pyramid Mountains are a moderate altitude, north-south trending mountain range at the north of two valleys that also are north-south, and extensive, as the Continental Divide traverses due south through the ridgeline to enter northwest Chihuahua state, Mexico. The Animas Valley lies west; the Playas Valley lies east of this mountain-series ridgeline.

The Pyramid Mountains are about 30 mi long, and about 12 mi at its widest. Various peaks and hills form the range as the water divide of the continental divide forms its southeast and south. But the water divide of the Animas Valley continues north 20 mi and then crosses to the north side of Lordsburg.

Various semi-arid canyons, draws, and washes also are found in this linear range.

List of peaks and hills
The range consists of a north and south portions separated by a lower elevation pass between Jose Placencia Canyon on the west and Muir Draw on the east.

North:
Pyramid Peak,  (highpoint)
Fourmile Hill, 
Leitendorf Hills 
Swallow Fork Peak,  (west)
Cedar Mountain,  (east)
South:
Cedar Knob,  (east)
Lightning Dock Mountain,  (west)
Russel Hills  (east)
Kink Peak,  (west)
South Pyramid Peak,  (continental divide)
Pinkey Wright Mountain,  (continental divide)

Continental Divide
The Continental Divide starts to leave the forested mountain regions as it goes southwest from Silver City. It passes from the southern Little Burro Mountains, crosses the Big Burro's, then on a circuitous route after skirting the northeast of the Cedar Mountain Range, it passes across the water divide of the north Playas Valley, west of Hachita. It finally enters a series of north-south ranges, including the Animas Mountains, and traverses south into northwest Chihuahua, Mexico.

It turns from due-west to due-south at South Pyramid Peak, at the southern perimeter region of the Pyramid Mountains. Pinkey Wright Mountain lies 3 mi south on the divide.

References

Great Divide of North America
Mountain ranges of Hidalgo County, New Mexico
Mountain ranges of New Mexico